Amor a Ciegas (stylized as #AMORACIEGAS) is a Mexican web series written by Adriana Pelusi and directed by Carlos Quintanilla.  It premiered on azteca.com in March 2014, but has since aired after Ventaneando, on Wednesdays, at 4:00pm.

Amor a Ciegas is the first web series produced by Azteca CEFAT, Azteca's acting school.

Episodes

References

2014 telenovelas
2014 Mexican television series debuts
Mexican telenovelas
TV Azteca telenovelas
Spanish-language telenovelas